Edward Ou was born on 16 October 1980 in Taiwan. He is a Taiwanese actor and TV host. He graduated from Taipei Hwa Kang Arts School in 1998.

Ou is junior to other Taiwanese entertainers such as Barbie Shu, whom he co-starred with in the Meteor Garden series, and Dee Shu; and senior to Alien Huang, Rainie Yang, Genie Chuo and Cyndi Wang. He and Show Luo are disciples as TV hosts to Hu Gua.

Filmography

TV Series

Soundtrack contribution
 2002 – "Close To You" – Meteor Garden II Original Soundtrack

TV Host
 Asia Entertainment Centre – Azio TV 
 Boyz Adventure (惡童探險記) – Azio TV
 100% Entertainment –  Gala Television (GTV) Variety Show/CH 28
 TVBS G-Entertainment (tvbs G娛樂主播)

References

External links
 

1980 births
Living people
Taiwanese male television actors